Dangerous Branch is a stream in Ray County in the U.S. state of Missouri. It is a tributary of the Crooked River.

The stream headwaters arise at  adjacent to the west side of Missouri Route A and 8.5 miles northeast of Richmond.

Dangerous Branch was so named because it is prone to flash flooding.

See also
List of rivers of Missouri

References

Rivers of Ray County, Missouri
Rivers of Missouri